Sewer Gators is a 2022 American horror comedy film written and directed by Paul Dale, and starring Manon Pages, Austin Naulty, and Kenny Bellau. The film was released on Blu-ray, DVD, and video-on-demand (VOD) on June 3, 2022.

Cast
 Manon Pages as Laura Andrews, an alligator expert
 Austin Naulty as Shane, an alligator hunter
 Kenny Bellau as Sheriff Mitchell

Production

Casting
Writer-director Paul Dale first met actress Manon Pages some time prior to the production of Sewer Gators when Pages responded to a Craigslist advertisement that was seeking actors. Dale had met Austin Naulty during the production of the 2016 film Silent but Deadly, and met Kenny Bellau during the production of a commercial.

References

External links
 

2022 horror films
Films about crocodilians
Films based on urban legends
Films set in Louisiana
2020s English-language films